Sarah Anne Louise Montague, Lady Brooke (born 8 February 1966), is a British journalist and presenter of the BBC Radio 4 current affairs programme The World at One. For 18 years, prior to April 2018, she was a regular presenter of another radio programme: Today.

Early life
Montague was born to John Montague, a Colonel in the British Army, and Mary (née O'Malley) on Guernsey, a British Crown dependency and one of the Channel Islands. After attending Blanchelande College, a local independent school for girls, she read Biology at the University of Bristol, gaining a BSc.

Career
Montague's first occupation was as a stockbroker for County NatWest and then a Eurobond dealer with NatWest Capital Markets in London. She then went into business in London with the owner of  men's clothing retailer  Charles Tyrwhitt.

Montague began her journalistic career with Channel Television in 1991. She joined Reuters in January 1995 and then became business correspondent for Sky News in January 1996.

She joined the BBC during October 1997, and presented Newsnight, Breakfast and BBC News, before joining the Today news programme on BBC Radio 4 in 2002. She presented the first programme on BBC News 24 with Gavin Esler on 9 November 1997. She has also presented HARDtalk on BBC News. In December 2008, she hosted BBC World's Nobel Minds in the library of the Royal Palace, Stockholm. The 2008 Nobel Prize winners in Physics, Chemistry, Medicine, Economics, and Literature had a round-table discussion on issues of global concern and their own contributions to the world of knowledge.

On 6 November 2010, Montague broke a strike at the BBC called by the National Union of Journalists. She arrived to present the Today programme at 3:30 am, along with fellow presenter Evan Davis, not crossing the picket line. On 15 July 2011, she again broke an NUJ strike by presenting Today with Justin Webb, again by arriving early.

In 2013, she was awarded an honorary degree Doctor of Letters by the University of Sussex. On 10 February 2015, she was awarded the degree of Doctor of Laws honoris causa from the University of Bristol.

After 18 years, she left Radio 4’s flagship current affairs programme in April 2018 to take over the lead on the lunchtime news broadcast The World at One from Martha Kearney. She was earning much less than her male colleagues, with John Humphrys earning more than four times her salary. She described herself as "incandescent with rage" when she found out she was earning less than other presenters. In January 2020 Montague revealed that she had received a £400,000 settlement and an apology from the BBC for her unequal treatment.

In 2018, she was criticised for misattributing the Electoral Commission's findings that the Vote Leave campaign broke the law in the 2016 referendum, thereby protecting several government ministers from pressure to resign. She repeatedly referred to “these allegations”, when they were, in fact, the findings of the statutory body charged with protecting the 2016 referendum and the integrity of UK elections. The Electoral Commission finding and fine were overruled in court in July 2019. The defendant in the court case said "This raises serious questions about its [The Electoral Commission's] conduct both during and after the referendum.".

Personal life
In 2002 Montague married Sir Richard Christopher Brooke. They were guests at a party in 2014 co-hosted by then-Prime Minister David Cameron, with whom Brooke attended Eton College. In 2012 her husband inherited the Brooke baronetcy, becoming the 12th baronet.

Montague is the mother of three daughters and also has a stepdaughter.

References

External links

 Profile @ BBC News
 BBC Radio 4 Profile
 
 Articles for the New Statesman

1966 births
Living people
Alumni of the University of Bristol
BBC newsreaders and journalists
British journalists
British women journalists
British stockbrokers
British women television journalists
Guernsey women
British radio presenters
British women radio presenters
Women stockbrokers